The Type 88 self-propelled anti-aircraft gun (military designation: PGZ-88 – ; pinyin: bābā shì zìxíng gāoshèpào, "Type 88 self-propelled anti-aircraft artillery") is a Chinese self-propelled anti-aircraft vehicle manufactured by Norinco. Developed since the early 1980s, Type 88 was the first fully-automatic SPAAG system produced by China. The vehicle chassis is based on Type 79 tank, and armaments include Type 74 twin-37 millimeter cannons, a surveillance radar, electro-optical sensor, ballistic computer, and friend or foe identification system. The system was only used in the People's Liberation Army for limited evaluation trials.

References

Weapons of the People's Republic of China
Self-propelled anti-aircraft weapons of China
Armoured fighting vehicles of the People's Republic of China
Military vehicles introduced in the 1980s